Indian Culinary Institute, Tirupati(ICI-Tirupati) is the first culinary institute established by the Indian Tourism Ministry to be located in Tirupati in Chittoor District of Andhra Pradesh. It began classes during academic year 2016–17 on a temporary campus on the premises of the State Institute of Hotel Management (SIHM) in Alipiri. The admissions are done through the Joint Entrance Exam (JEE) for a three-year Bachelor of Business Administration in Culinary Art (BBA – Culinary) in affiliation with IGNTU-Amarkantak. In 2018, the institute shifted to its own campus near Tirupati Airport. In the same year it also opened its Noida Campus for the culinary aspirants. 

From academic year 2019–20, it launched a 2 year MBA program (MBA in Culinary Arts) at both campuses.

References

External links

Universities and colleges in Tirupati
Educational institutions established in 2016
2016 establishments in Andhra Pradesh